Georgetown Township may refer to the following places in the United States:

 Georgetown Township, Vermilion County, Illinois
 Georgetown Township, Floyd County, Indiana
 Georgetown Township, Michigan
 Georgetown Township, Clay County, Minnesota

Township name disambiguation pages